Neil Stuart Roberts (born 3 January 1955) is a former Australian politician.

Politics 
Roberts represented the seat of Nudgee in the Legislative Assembly of Queensland from 1995 to 2012. He was the Minister for Emergency Services, Corrective Services, and Police in Queensland.

On 11 December 2011, he announced he would not be contesting the 2012 Queensland state election.

References

1955 births
Living people
Members of the Queensland Legislative Assembly
Australian Labor Party members of the Parliament of Queensland
21st-century Australian politicians